Mastic tree is a common name for several plants and may refer to:

 Pistacia lentiscus (Anacardiaceae) – mastic – Mediterranean region
 Sideroxylon foetidissimum (Sapotaceae) – yellow mastic or false mastic – Caribbean region and Central America
 Terminalia eriostachya (Combretaceae) – black mastic – Cuba and Cayman Islands